Unilink may refer to:
 Unilink, a branded bus service
 The unilink coupler used in Finland